Nine Sols is an upcoming 2D action-platformer developed and published by Red Candle Games. The game is set in an Asian fantasy-inspired, futuristic cyberpunk world that tells the story of a legendary hero from the past named Yi who is on a quest for revenge to overthrow the titular nine Sols, the powerful, tyrannical rulers of a deserted realm known as New Kunlun. In gameplay, combat emphasizes on the player deflecting attacks from enemies to build up energy to perform special attacks which takes strong inspiration from Sekiro: Shadows Die Twice. It features a hand-drawn animation and a storyline for players to experience. Like Red Candle's other games, Nine Sols features elements of Taiwanese culture. The game is scheduled to be released in Q2 2023.

Premise

Gameplay 
Nine Sols is a 2D action-platformer where player is in the role of Yi whose overall goal to defeat the nine Sols to get revenge. The focus is on close-range combat mixed with classic side-scrolling platforming and deflection mechanics. Basic attack is slashing with a sword, but can the player can deflect enemy attacks. When deflecting attacks from enemies, Yi while absorbing and accumulating Chi energy to unleash stylish charging attacks on enemies by a technique called "reverse deflect". When reverse deflecting, Yi will dash through his opponents and sticks talismans called "Foo charms" to blow up as they are activating. Deflecting also requires precise reflexes and timing to fill up on Chi. The higher the energy bar the more damage the attacks. In addition, Yi possesses the powerful Godly Bow to mix up in combat situations. In regards to movement, Yi can run, dash, mid-air dash, double jump, wall jump, climb, wall run, and grapple.

Development

References

External links 

 Crowdfunding campaign official site 

Upcoming video games scheduled for 2023
Action video games
Platform games
Side-scrolling video games
Windows games
MacOS games
Video games developed in Taiwan
Video games with alternate endings
Cyberpunk video games
Science fiction video games
Fantasy video games
Dystopian video games
Red Candle Games
Video games based on mythology
Video games based on Chinese mythology
Single-player video games